Jumana Nawaf Fahad Murad (born on 1 April 1973 in As-Suwayda) is a Syrian actress and producer. She is one of the most famous actresses in Syrian and Arabic media.

Early life and career 
Murad born in As-Suwayda to Durzi family, she studied English literature in Damascus University. She began her career as presenter in Ajman TV. Her first act was in Pictures fregments in 1998. She also acted in Bab Al-Hara. She acted Zenobia role in 2007. She also opened producing company Jumana International for film, television and distribution.

Personal life 
Since 2013, she has been married to Jordanian lawyer Rabie Besiso. She was previously married two times, first marriage was to Syrian director Najdat Anzour and the second was to a Syrian businessman whom she refused to acknowledge the name of. In February 2019, she gave birth to her first son Mohammed. In 2020, she gave birth to twins: a son called Ali and a daughter called Diana who were born premature. Diana has died in March 2021.

Works

Series 
 Pictures fragments (1998)
 Al Bawasel (2000)
 Al Masloob (2001)
 Searching for Saladin (2001)
 Escaping to summit (2002)
 Al Tareq (2004)
 The white thread (2005)
 Revenge of Rose (2006)
 Love biography (2007)
 Eve in history (2007)
 Shame Slang (2008)
 Like that we married (2008)
 Bab Al-Hara (3-5 season) (2008-2010)
 On the sea wave (2009)
 Witness proof (2010)
 Men Wanted (2011)
 Pharaoh (2013)
 Love School (2019)

Films 
 The Devils (2007)
 Shabaan Alfares (2008)
 Kabare (2008)
 Femininity seconds (2008)
 The Happiness (2009)
 Palm of Moon (2011)
 The Party (2013)

References

External links 
 Jumana Murad on alcinema 
 Jumana Murad on IMDb

1973 births
Living people
Syrian people of Druze descent
People from as-Suwayda
Syrian Druze
Syrian film actresses
Syrian television actresses
21st-century Syrian actresses
Syrian producers
Damascus University alumni